Brachymylus is an extinct genus of cartilaginous fish belonging to the subclass Holocephali, which includes the modern-day chimaeras.

References

Prehistoric cartilaginous fish genera
Jurassic cartilaginous fish
Cretaceous cartilaginous fish
Prehistoric fish of Europe
Chimaeriformes